Benny Heller was a jazz rhythm guitarist who is known for his work with Benny Goodman. He won a Down Beat Readers' Poll in 1938 and 1940.

By 1991, he was selling Gretsch instruments in Washington.

References 

Year of birth missing
Possibly living people
American jazz guitarists
American male guitarists
American male jazz musicians